Mahabharat Katha is an Indian television series aired on DD National. This is a sequel which contains portions and stories left out of Mahabharat. It was produced by B. R. Chopra and directed by his son Ravi Chopra.

Plot
This series covers events not included in the original show including the life of Ghatotkatch, Hidimbaa, Barbareek, Aftermath of War, Arjuna's various marriages, Karna's marriage with Padmavati and his son, Vrishketu and mourning after the war.

The series also showcases the story's Ashwamedha yagna, during which Arjuna's son Babruvahana, prince of Manipur fights Arjuna and Vrishketu when the horse of yagna reaches Manipur. In the fight, Arjun and Vrishketu are killed. However, Krishna revives both of them and everyone lives happily ever after.

Cast
Harish Bhimani as Samay
Rishabh Shukla replaced Nitish Bhardwaj as Krishna
 Sagar Salunkhe as Balarama
Arjun as Arjuna
 Bijay Anand as Babruvahana
 Gajendra Chauhan as Yudhisthira
 Praveen Kumar as Bhima
 Roopa Ganguly as Draupadi
 Puneet Issar as Duryodhana
 Durga Jasraj as Ulupi
 Mukesh Khanna as Bhishma
 Kartika Rane as Satyabhama
 Bhakti Narula as Kunti
 Veena Rao as Dussala
 Sonu Walia as Chitrāngadā
 Arun Bali as King Chitravahan
 Surendra Pal as Dronacharya
 Rajesh Vivek as Vyasa
 Manoj Verma as Kamadeva
 Prajakta as Rati
 Kiran Juneja as Ganga
 Virendra Razdan as Vidura
Manish Khanna 
Ayub Khan (actor)  as Parikshit Abhimanyu's Son
Aman Verma as  Vrishketu  
 Bijay Anand  as  Babruvahan 
 Adi Irani as Chandak 
 Nimai Bali  as  Anushalva
 Deepak Jethi  as Barbarik
 Jeetendra Trehan as Suryadev
 Sudesh Berry  as Indradev 
 Shashi Sharma as Naagrani 
 Deepak Qazir  as Anushalva's Mama

Episodes

 Episode 1 – Barbareek goes to meet the Pandavas. Everyone gets tensed by his power of three arrows.
 Episode 2 – Shakuni convinces Duryodhana to kill unarmed Barbareek.
 Episode 3 – Draupadi goes to Krishna to find a solution for Barbareek. Krishna narrates the story of Barbareek.
 Episode 4 – Krishna kills Narakasur and rescues sixteen thousand queens.
 Episode 5 – Ghatotkach goes to marry Mourvi Barbareek is born.
 Episode 6 – Barbareek goes to Krishna as a disciple.
 Episode 7 – Krishna sends Barbareek to be a disciple of Guru Vijay Siddha Sen.
 Episode 8 – Barbareek performs severe penance to please Kamakhya Devi and gets three powerful arrows. Bheem and Barbareek meet.
 Episode 9 – Barbareek meets Bheesma Pitamah. Krishna tests Barbareek's arrows. Barbareek gives his head as guru Dakshina to Krishna.
 Episode 10 – Barbareek's head is kept on a mountain to witness the Kurukshetra war. War begins.
 Episode 11 – Ashwathama kills the sons of Pandavas and takes their heads to Duryodhana.
 Episode 12 – War ends. Barbareek's head is joined to his body and he leaves for sanyas.
 Episode 13 – Everyone laments loss due to war. Arjun begs for forgiveness from Ganga but she refuses to forgive.
 Episode 14 – Yudhisthir dreams of being reprimanded by Bheesma, Drona, and Karna.
 Episode 15 – Yudhisthir gets ready to take sanyas. Krishna convinces him of Raja dharma and he stays back to be the king and serve Hastinapur.
 Episode 16 – Story of Karna marrying Padmavati.
 Episode 17 – Kunti takes Padmavati and her son Vrishaketu to Hastinapur.
 Episode 18 – Meghavarna (Barbareek's brother) and Vrishaketu together set out to bring shyamkarn horse and fight with the armies of Bhadravati king Yuvanashva.
 Episode 19 – Meghavarna and Vrishaketu bring the shyamkarn horse. Padmavati kidnapped by Anushalva from Ashwamedha yajna.
 Episode 20 – Arjun goes to free Padmavati but is himself caught. Krishna goes for their rescue.
 Episode 21 – Krisna shows his Virat roop and kills Upadrav. Ashwamedha yajna begins.
 Episode 22 – Reconciliation between Dushala and Arjun.
 Episode 23 – Ashwamedha horse reaches the Madra Kingdom. Shakuni's son Viprachitti and Madra king Arun play a Dice Game.
 Episode 24 – Viprachitti captures Ashwamedha's horse. On Gandhari's and his mother Charulata's insistence, he mends his relation with Bheem.
 Episode 25 – Viprachitti throws away the dice of his father Shakuni and promises never to indulge in gambling again.
 Episode 26 – Ashwamedha horse moves next to Saurashtra. Balaram accepts Arjun's peace proposal on Krisha's request.
 Episode 27 – Ashwamedha reaches Manipura. Babruvahan gets a boon from Kamakhya Devi. Flashback of Babruvahan's story begins.
 Episode 28 – Arjun visits Naglok and meets Ulupi. Ulupi sets out to kill Arjuna.
 Episode 29 – Ulupi kidnaps Arjun and takes him to Naglok.
 Episode 30 – Love blossoms between Ulupi and Arjuna
 Episode 31 – Nagraj accepts Arjun's peace proposal.
 Episode 32 – Arjun stays for an extra day for amavasya and swayamvar in Naglok
 Episode 33 – Arjun marries Ulupi. Fight between Chitrangada and Arjun.
 Episode 34 – Chitrangada invokes Kamadev and gets her blessing to regain her forgotten woman traits. Manipur king accepts Arjun's peace proposal.
 Episode 35 – Ulupi gives birth to Iravan. Arjun saves Chitrangada from drowning.
 Episode 36 – Krishna convinces Arjun to marry Chitrangada and the marriage takes place.
 Episode 37 – Chandak swears to take revenge against Arjun. He goes to Manipur to invite Arjun for Ulupi's son Iravan's birthday.
 Episode 38 – Ulupi and Chandak trick Arjuna to believe Chitrangada is having extramarital affair.
 Episode 39 – Arjun doubts Chitrangada of infidelity and abandons her. Chitrangada gives birth to Babruvahan.
 Episode 40 – Arjun meets Krishna in Dwarka and realizes his injustice towards Chitrangada. Ulupi realizes her mistake. Babruvahan is grown up and swears to defeat Arjun. Flashback of Babruvahan's story ends (which had begun in episode 27).
 Episode 41 – Vrishaketu leaves for Manipur. Bheem goes to capture Babruvahan.
 Episode 42 – Babruvahan defeats Bheem and kills Vrishaketu.
 Episode 43 – Babruvahan kills Arjun.
 Episode 44 – Babruvahan and Chitrangada leave for Naglok to bring nagmani for saving Arjun.
 Episode 45 – Arjun and Vrishaketu are brought back to life by Krishna.

Production
The cast and crew were the same as the original series, except some actors like  Nitish Bhardwaj who played Krishna in the original series was replaced by Rishabh Shukla (who had played the role of Shantanu in the original series) and Nazneen who played Kunti in the original series was replaced by Bhakti Narula.

The 45-episode Hindi series ran on DD National.

Home media 
In 2019, Pen India Ltd bought the rights of the show and uploaded all the episodes on its devotional YouTube channel Pen Bhakti including the origional series Mahabharat (1988 TV series).

References

External links

1991 Indian television series debuts
DD National original programming
Television series based on Mahabharata
Indian television spin-offs